Se Ratey Purnima Chilo (Original: সে রাতে পূর্ণিমা ছিল) is a Bengali novel by Shahidul Zahir. It was published in Dhaka by Mowla Brothers in 1995 as the second novel by Zahir. It's based on the story of killing the family of Mofizuddin Miah, the dictator of Suhasini village.

In popular culture
In 2016, a play with the same title based on this novel was produced by Natyadal Arshinagar and directed by Reza Arif.

References

Sources

1995 books
1995 novels
Bengali-language novels
Novels by Shahidul Zahir